Genethlius was a 3rd-century Arab sophist from Petra, Arabia Petraea. His father was also named Genethlius.

He was a pupil of the Greek sophists Minucianus and Agapetus, and then he himself became a teacher and practiced rhetoric in Athens. He has been known as a rival to the famous Callinicus of Petra.

Genethlius is also thought by some scholars to be the author of the first treatise in the corpus of Menander Rhetor.

References 

Arabs in the Roman Empire
Arab Christians
Sophists
3rd-century births
3rd-century Arabs